Gallus August Suter (20 January 1829, in Nesslau – 13 September 1901) was a Swiss politician and President of the Swiss National Council (1890).

External links 
 
 

1829 births
1901 deaths
People from the canton of St. Gallen
Swiss Calvinist and Reformed Christians
Free Democratic Party of Switzerland politicians
Members of the National Council (Switzerland)
Presidents of the National Council (Switzerland)